Terras de Riba-Côa or simply Riba-Côa is a historical area in central Portugal. It was located roughly between Côa and Águeda rivers.

Regions of Portugal